The House at 7 Salem Street in Wakefield, Massachusetts is a transitional Greek Revival/Italianate style house built c. 1855–57.  The -story wood-frame house has a typical Greek Revival side hall plan, with door and window surrounds that are also typical to that style.  However, it also bears clear Italianate styling with the arched window in the gable, and the paired brackets in the eaves.  A single-story porch wraps around the front and side, supported by simple square columns.  Its occupant in 1857 was a ticket agent for the Boston and Maine Railroad.

The house was listed on the National Register of Historic Places in 1989.

See also
National Register of Historic Places listings in Wakefield, Massachusetts
National Register of Historic Places listings in Middlesex County, Massachusetts

References

Houses in Wakefield, Massachusetts
Houses on the National Register of Historic Places in Wakefield, Massachusetts
Italianate architecture in Massachusetts
Houses completed in 1855
1855 establishments in Massachusetts